Spiribacter salinus is a moderately halophilic bacterium from the genus of Spiribacter.

References 

Chromatiales
Bacteria described in 2014
Halophiles